Carolyne Larrington (born 1959) is a Professor of Medieval European Literature and Official Fellow of St John's College at the University of Oxford. Her research has primarily been on Old Norse and medieval Arthurian literature. Her areas of focus have included how emotion and women are portrayed.

Selected publications
 Larrington, C. (1992). The feminist companion to mythology. Pandora Press.
 Larrington, Carolyne (1996) Poetic Edda (Oxford University Press)
 Larrington, C. (2001). The psychology of emotion and study of the medieval period. Early Medieval Europe, 10(2), 251-256.
 Larrington, Carolyne (2017) Norse Myths: A Guide to the Gods and Heroes (Thames & Hudson)

References

External links 

 
 
 
 

1959 births
Living people
Fellows of St John's College, Oxford
Place of birth missing (living people)
British literary historians
Women literary historians
British antiquarians